Space Delta 11 (DEL 11) is a United States Space Force unit responsible for space range and aggressor. It conducts live and virtual training and operations for test and training requirements. It was established on 23 August 2021 following the establishment of the Space Training and Readiness Command, the field command to which it reports.  It is temporarily headquartered at Schriever Space Force Base, Colorado, but its final location requires a base selection process.

A ceremony was held on 30 August 2021 to recognize the delta's activation.

Structure 
DEL 11 is one of five deltas that reports to the Space Training and Readiness Command. It is composed of five subordinate units, two of which are newly created and the remaining two of which are the following squadrons: It plans to add an on-orbit space range unit, the 98th Space Range Squadron, and a space aggressor squadron.

List of commanders

References

External links 

 Fact Sheet

Deltas of the United States Space Force